Petrikirche means St. Peter's Church in German and may refer to any of a number of churches in German-speaking regions.

Germany
St. Peter's Church, Hamburg
St. Peter's Church, Herford
St. Peter's Church, Rostock
The former Petrikirche in Cölln, Berlin: see Fischerinsel#Notable buildings